Shotwell is an unincorporated community in rural eastern Wake County, North Carolina, United States, located about  south of Knightdale and  east of Raleigh at the confluence of Smithfield, Mial Plantation, Major Slade, Grasshopper, and Turnipseed Roads.  Shotwell has been inhabited since the early 19th century and is home to a number of historic structures.  A post office was established in 1883 but closed less than two decades later.

Oaky Grove was listed on the National Register of Historic Places in 1993.

See also
 Walnut Hill Cotton Gin
 Walnut Hill Historic District (Knightdale, North Carolina)

References

Unincorporated communities in Wake County, North Carolina
Unincorporated communities in North Carolina